INS Sufa may refer to one of the following ships of the Israeli Navy:

Israeli Navy ship names